Braunsia apiculata is a perennial succulent plant belonging to the ice plant family (Aizoaceae). Originally native from South Africa, it has been introduced elsewhere.

The magenta flowers open in early spring. It silvery green leaves grow in pairs, stacking one pair of leaves on top of the other.

Aizoaceae
Taxa named by Louisa Bolus